Jennie Grossinger (June 16, 1892 – November 20, 1972) was an Austrian-American hotel executive and philanthropist. She is considered one of the great hostesses of 20th-century. She was the hostess of one of the largest Borscht Belt resorts, Grossinger's Catskill Resort Hotel. Beginning from the 1930s, she started to give up many of her business responsibilities, and started to devote herself to philanthropic causes. In her life, she had received several  honors and awards for her philanthropic and social services.

Life

Early life 
Jennie Grossinger was born into a poor Jewish family on June 16, 1892, in Baligrod, a small village in Galicia, Austria, now a part of Poland. She was the eldest daughter of three children of Malka Grossinger; née Grumet, and her husband, Asher Selig, who was an estate overseer. Her family migrated to the US in 1900. She had gone to a state-funded school in New York City, however at age 13, her schooling was stopped as she started working as a buttonhole creator. Her brother was profoundly deaf, hence her mother went back to Europe to find relevant medical help for him.

Career 

Jennie Grossinger continued to work 11 hours a day and attend night school. She used to help her father and sister, and send money to her mother back in Europe. In 1912, she wedded Harry Grossinger, her cousin, who was a clothing manufacturing factory's production man. She then went to work as a cashier in her family's new business enterprise, a small restaurant. In 1914, the restaurant business was abandoned due to her father's mental and physical breakdown.

At that point, the family moved to an overview farmhouse in the Catskill Mountains, where they expected to earn enough to pay the bills by developing harvests, which ultimately fizzled following a couple of months. From that point forward, they started to take-in summer guests, the vast majority of whom were individual Jewish workers and were searching for minimal expense excursions. Thus a small hotel emerged named Longbrook House, in which Jennie Grossinger was the bookkeeper, chambermaid, host, and her mother used to oversee the kosher kitchen. Her husband continued to live and work in New York City, however, he assisted the business by doing the marketing part and also used to provide guests from his acquaintance. In 1914, during their first summer season, they facilitated nine guests who had paid an aggregate of $81. In the next year, they renovated the hotel by adding six rooms, and building a new wing, providing for 20 guests.

The hotel soon became well known for its food and reasonable rates. Harry Grossinger left his place of employment in New York City and joined the inn business in 1916. The family sold their previous farmhouse and had purchased a larger property near by in 1919.The new property had a bigger and better-prepared lodging building. Subsequently, they purchased 63 acres of land of woods, and a lake, hence, providing the guests with fishing and various sporting facilities. In the impending decade, their inn business gradually extended, and by 1929, had a guests limit of 500. That year, they hired musician Milton Blackstone, to promote their business. He at that point recommended offering a free vacation to couples who met at the resort, which maintained. He likewise concocted the motto "Grossinger's has everything."

After the end of World War II, Grossinger continued directing the development of the hotel and made it a more expanded client base. In 1948, guests who were not Orthodox Jews begun to get special providing on the Jewish Sabbath. In 1964, Harry Grossinger died. Following his death, Jennie Grossinger handed over the business to her children, who were already involved in the management.

The hotel stayed a family-run business till 1986, when it was offered to Servico, Inc. They at that point leveled the old inn structures to clear a path for additional up-to-date offices and facilities, with a spa, a connoisseur lounge area, and an 8,000-square-foot sporting lounge, directed for youthful customers.

Philanthropy 
From the 1930s, Grossinger started to assign a considerable lot of her previous business-related obligations and began to commit herself to humanitarian activities. Much of her charity works were for Jewish and non-sectarian causes. She focused on doing charity activities in the Jewish homeland of Israel. There she helped with building a medical center and a convalescent home. Out of her sheer interest in education, The Hebrew University of Jerusalem benefited from her charity. She donated money to help mentally disabled children in several children's hospitals and care facilities. She also donated money to fight tuberculosis, and for the proper medication of arthritic patients.

Personal life 
In 1913, Jennie and Harry Grossinger had their first child, who died in infancy. Later they had another child, Paul. In 1927, they had a daughter, Elaine. Jennie Grossinger was plagued by ill-health throughout her life. She used to suffer from chronic high blood pressure, severe headaches, back problems, and depression. In 1941, and 1946, she underwent major surgeries.

Death 
On November 20, 1972, Grossinger died in her house at Grossinger's of a stroke, having handed the business over to her children back in 1964, and who had for quite some time been associated with its administration.

Awards and honors 
In her lifetime, Grossinger had received several honors and awards including honorary degrees from  New England College, and Wilberforce University in Ohio for her philanthropic works.

In popular culture

TV 

 This is your life, season: 3, episode: 14 (1954)

Literature 

 Grossinger, Richard (1997). Out of Babylon: Ghosts of Grossinger's. Frog, Limited. .
 Grossinger, Tania (2008-06-17). Growing Up at Grossinger's. Skyhorse Publishing Inc. .
 Drachman, Virginia G. (2002). Enterprising Women: 250 Years of American Business. UNC Press Books. .
 Neidle, Cecyle S. (1975). America's Immigrant Women. Twayne Publishers. .
 Goldstein, Samantha Hope (2000). "Don't Mind Me, I'll Just Sit Here in the Dark": Illuminating the Role of Women in Catskills Performative Culture. University of California, San Diego.

Bibliography 

 Candee, Marjorie Dent (1956). Current biography yearbook, 1956. New York: H.W. Wilson. .
 Sicherman, Barbara; Green, Carol Hurd (1980). Notable American Women: The Modern Period : a Biographical Dictionary. Harvard University Press. .
 Pomerantz, Joel (1970). Jennie and the Story of Grossinger's. Grosset & Dunlap. .
 Encyclopedia of World Biography: 20th Century Supplement. J. Heraty. 1987. .
 Encyclopaedia Judaica. Encyclopaedia Judaica. 1996. .
 Brawarsky, Sandee; Mark, Deborah (1998). Two Jews, Three Opinions: A Collection of Twentieth-century American Jewish Quotations. Perigee Books. .

Additional references 

 "Grossinger, Jennie (1892–1972) ." Women in World History: A Biographical Encyclopedia. Retrieved April 17, 2021 from Encyclopedia.com
 Kanfer, Stefan. "NY: Bulldozers Have the Last Laugh," in Time. October 27, 1986.
 Shepard, Richard F. (1972-11-21). "Jennie Grossinger Dies at Resort Home". The New York Times. . Retrieved 2021-05-29
 The New York Times Book Review. New York Times Company. 1976.
 "Jennie Grossinger Day!". Jewish Women's Archive. Retrieved 2021-05-29.

External links 

1892 births
1972 deaths
American Jews
American people of Austrian-Jewish descent
American people of Polish-Jewish descent
American women business executives
American women philanthropists
Austro-Hungarian emigrants to the United States
Austro-Hungarian Jews
People from Lesko County